The 1997 Summer Deaflympics, officially known as the 18th Summer Deaflympics, was an international multi-sport event that was celebrated from 13 July to 26 July 1997 in Copenhagen, Denmark.

Medal Tally

References
 Deatlympics

 
Deaflympics
Parasports in Denmark
1997 in Danish sport
International sports competitions in Copenhagen
July 1997 sports events in Europe
1990s in Copenhagen